Ferrari Virtual Academy (or FVA) is a sim racing video game for Microsoft Windows developed by Kunos Simulazioni and released in September 2010. The simulation allows the player to drive a Ferrari against the clock at a race track. There are no other vehicles to race against in real time.

In January 2015, the servers (needed even for single player gaming) were down for some time, with Ferrari ending its support for the game. As of February 2015, the simulation can be used, however it can no longer be purchased.

Gameplay
The game offers two modes: Free Practice in which driving aids such as traction control, assisted braking, visible driving line and automatic transmission are permitted and the player can decide how much fuel should be in the car; and Hot Lap mode in which no driving aids are allowed, the fuel amount is fixed and reset each lap. Times set in Hot Lap mode are entered into an online leaderboard.

Content
The initial release offered only the Fiorano test track and the Ferrari F10 Formula One car. Purchase of the Adrenaline Pack upgrade released in November 2011 added the Mugello and Nürburgring race circuits as well as the Ferrari 150º Italia Formula One car of the 2011 season and the Ferrari 458 sports car.

References

Racing video games
Racing simulators
Video games developed in Italy
Ferrari video games
Windows games
Windows-only games
2010 video games
Kunos Simulazioni games